Romstal is the biggest sanitaryware distributor in Romania and one of the largest in Eastern Europe with 198 stores located in Romania, Ukraine, Serbia, Moldova, Bulgaria and Italy. The company also provides electrical and insulation materials.

In 2007 the company acquired the Serbian sanitation equipment retailer Doming for an estimated € 10 million.

Romstal in Europe
Romstal operates stores in seven European countries.

References

External links
Official site

Companies based in Bucharest
Privately held companies of Romania
Romanian brands